Dondersiidae is a family of molluscs belonging to the order Pholidoskepia.

Genera

Genera:
 Dondersia Hubrecht, 1888 
 Heathia Thiele, 1913  
 Helluoherpia Handl & Buchinger, 1996

References

Molluscs